Jeroboam I (Hebrew:  Yārŏḇə‘ām) was the first king of the northern Kingdom of Israel. The Hebrew Bible describes the reign of Jeroboam to have commenced following a revolt of the ten northern Israelite tribes against Rehoboam that put an end to the United Monarchy.

Jeroboam reigned for 22 years. William F. Albright has dated his reign from 922 to 901 BC, while Edwin R. Thiele offers the dates 931 to 910 BC.

Etymology
The name Jeroboam  is commonly held to have been derived from riyb  and ʿam , signifying "the people contend" or "he pleads the people's cause". It is alternatively translated to mean "his people are many" or "he increases the people" (from  rbb, meaning "to increase"), or even "he that opposes the people". In the Septuagint he is called Hieroboam (Ἱεροβοάμ).

Biblical background
Jeroboam was the son of Nebat, a member of the Tribe of Ephraim of Zereda. His mother, named Zeruah (צרוע "leprous") was a widow. He had at least two sons, Abijah and Nadab, who succeeded him on the throne.

While still a young man, King Solomon made him superintendent over his tribesmen in the building of the fortress Millo in Jerusalem and of other public works, and he naturally became conversant with the widespread discontent caused by the extravagances which marked the reign of Solomon.

Influenced by the words of the prophet Ahijah, he began to form conspiracies with the view of becoming king of the ten northern tribes; but these were discovered, and he fled to Egypt, where he remained under the protection of Pharaoh Shishak until the death of Solomon. After this event, he returned and participated in a delegation sent to ask the new king Rehoboam to reduce taxes. After Rehoboam rejected their petition, ten of the tribes withdrew their allegiance to the house of David and proclaimed Jeroboam their king, forming the northern kingdom of Israel (Samaria). Initially, only the tribes of Judah and Benjamin remained to form the new kingdom of Judah, loyal to Rehoboam.

Temples
Jeroboam rebuilt and fortified Shechem as the capital of the northern kingdom, and fearing that pilgrimages to the temple in Jerusalem prescribed by the Law might be an occasion for his people to go back to their old allegiance, he built two state temples  with golden calves, one in Bethel and the other in Dan. Although criticised for his cultic activities in 1 Kings, calf worship was not new in Israelite ritual, but a reintroduction of earlier ritual. Bethel and Dan were already established cultic sites. According to Rabbanic Literature Gehazi possessed a magnet by which he lifted up the idol made by Jeroboam, so that it was seen between heaven and earth; he had "Yhwh" engraved on it, and in consequence the idol (a calf) pronounced the first two words of the Decalogue (ib.).

According to 1 Kings, while Jeroboam was engaged in offering incense at Bethel, a "man of God" warned him that "a son named Josiah will be born to the house of David", who would destroy the altar (referring to King Josiah of Judah who would rule approximately three hundred years later). Attempting to arrest the prophet for his bold words of defiance, Jeroboam's hand was "dried up", and the altar before which he stood was rent asunder. At the entreaty of the man of God, his hand was restored to him again, but the miracle made no abiding impression on him. Jeroboam offered hospitality to the man of God but this was declined, not out of contempt but in obedience to the command of God. The prophecy is fulfilled in 2 Kings.

Identity of related figures 
This "man of God" who warned Jeroboam has been equated with a seer named Iddo.

The wife of Jeroboam is a character in the Hebrew Bible. She is unnamed in the Masoretic Text, but according to the Septuagint, she was an Egyptian princess called Ano:
And Sousakim gave to Jeroboam Ano the eldest sister of Thekemina his wife, to him as wife; she was great among the king's daughters... 

In 1 Kings, Jeroboam's son Abijah gets sick, and he sends his wife to the prophet Ahijah. Ahijah's message, however, is that Abijah will die, which he does. According to the Jewish Encyclopedia the good that Abijah did for which he would be laid in the grave:"Rabbinical Literature:The passage, I Kings, xiv. 13, in which there is a reference to "some good thing [found in him] toward the Lord God of Israel," is interpreted (M. Ḳ. 28b) as an allusion to Abijah's courageous and pious act in removing the sentinels placed by his father on the frontier between Israel and Judah to prevent pilgrimages to Jerusalem. Some assert that he himself undertook a pilgrimage."

War with Judah

According to the Hebrew Bible, Jeroboam was in "constant war with the house of Judah". While the southern kingdom made no serious effort militarily to regain power over the north, there was a long-lasting boundary dispute, fighting over which lasted during the reigns of several kings on both sides before being finally settled.

In the eighteenth year of Jeroboam's reign, Abijah (also known as Abijam), Rehoboam's son, became king of Judah. During his short reign of three years, Abijah went to considerable lengths to bring the Kingdom of Israel back under his control. He waged a major battle against Jeroboam in the mountains of Ephraim. According to the Book of Chronicles Abijah had a force of 400,000 and Jeroboam 800,000. The Biblical sources mention that Abijah addressed the armies of Israel, urging them to submit and to let the Kingdom of Israel be whole again, but his plea fell on deaf ears. Abijah then rallied his own troops with a phrase which has since become famous: "God is with us as our leader". The biblical account states that his elite warriors fended off a pincer movement to rout Jeroboam's troops, killing 500,000 of them.

Jeroboam was crippled by this severe defeat to Abijah and posed little threat to the Kingdom of Judah for the rest of his reign. He also lost the towns of Bethel, Jeshanah, and Ephron, with their surrounding villages. Bethel was an important centre for Jeroboam's Golden Calf cult (which used non-Levites as priests), located on Israel's southern border, which had been allocated to the Tribe of Benjamin by Joshua, as was Ephron, which is believed to be the Ophrah that was allocated to the Tribe of Benjamin by Joshua.

Jeroboam died soon after Abijam.

Commentary on sources
The account of Jeroboam's life, like that of all his successors, ends with the formula "And the rest of the acts of Jeroboam, how he warred, and how he reigned, behold, they are written in the book of the chronicles of the kings of Israel".

"The Chronicles of the Kings of Israel", likely compiled by or derived from these kings' own scribes, is likely the source for the basic facts of Jeroboam's life and reign, though the compiler(s) of the extant Book of Kings clearly made selective use of it and added hostile commentaries.  His family was eventually wiped out.

The prophecies of doom concerning the fall of both the House of Jeroboam and the northern kingdom as a whole ("For the Lord shall smite Israel..., and he shall root up Israel out of this good land, which he gave to their fathers, and shall scatter them beyond the river", might have been composed retroactively, after the events described had already come to pass. Alternatively, the prophecy could have been a logical deduction. Judah had just been conquered and turned into a vassal of Egypt, while Israel stood between the Egyptian and Mesopotamian empires.

It is likely that the story of the golden calf in the wilderness was composed as a polemic against Jeroboam's cultic restoration by claiming that its origins were inconsistent with worship of YHWH.

In popular culture 
Jeroboam is portrayed by Nickolas Grace in Solomon & Sheba (1995) and by Richard Dillane in Solomon (1997). Both of these are television films.

References

Notes

Citations

Sources

,

External links

 Jeroboam at the Jewish Encyclopedia

10th-century BC Kings of Israel
900s BC deaths
Solomon
Year of birth unknown
House of Jeroboam
Golden calf